Kenrick Henry Harris (15 November 1885 – date of death unknown) was a Welsh cricketer. Harris' batting and bowling styles are unknown. He was born in Newport, Monmouthshire.

Harris made a single appearance for Glamorgan in the 1913 Minor Counties Championship against Monmouthshire.  Following World War I, he joined Monmouthshire, making his debut for the county in the 1921 Minor Counties Championship against the Surrey Second XI. He played Minor counties cricket for the county from 1921 to 1931, making 79 appearances for Monmouthshire.  During his career he played a single first-class match for Wales against the Marylebone Cricket Club in 1925.  In the Marylebone Cricket Club's first-innings, Harris took a five wicket haul with figures of 6/112. He batted once in the match, scoring 14 runs in the Wales first-innings before being dismissed by Frederick Burton.

His date and place of death is unknown.

References

External links
Kenrick Harris at ESPNcricinfo
Kenrick Harris  at CricketArchive

1885 births
Year of death unknown
Sportspeople from Newport, Wales
Welsh cricketers
Glamorgan cricketers
Monmouthshire cricketers
Wales cricketers